Kertomesis amblycryptis is a moth in the family Autostichidae. It was described by Edward Meyrick in 1929. It is found in India.

The wingspan is about 13 mm. The forewings are dark grey. The stigmata form small blackish spots, the plical beneath the first discal, a cloudy blackish spot on the dorsum almost beneath the second discal. The hindwings are grey.

References

Moths described in 1929
Kertomesis
Taxa named by Edward Meyrick